The Judgement is a 2020 Dutch drama film based on a non-fiction book by journalist Bas Haan about the Deventer murder case.  The film premiered at the Seattle Film Festival where it won six awards: the Grand Jury-prize, best director, best adapted screenplay, best actor (van Huêt), best supporting actor (van Wageningen) and  best supporting actress (Visschedijk). The film also won 4 Golden Calves for best film, best actor (Van Huet), best supporting actor (Van Wageningen) and best screenplay.

Cast
 Fedja van Huêt as Bas Haan
 Yorick van Wageningen as Michael de Jong
 Lies Visschedijk as Meike Wittermans
 Mark Kraan as Ernest Louwes
 George Tobal as Steve
Maurice de Hond who has a prominent role in the film was only shown through archival footage.

References

External links 
 

2020 films
Dutch drama films
2020s Dutch-language films
2020 drama films